Music television is a type of television programming which focuses predominantly on playing music videos from recording artists, usually on dedicated television channels broadcasting on satellite, cable, or Streaming Platforms.

Music television channels may host their own shows and charts and award prizes. Examples are MTV, Channel UFX, 4Music, 40 TV, Channel V, VIVA, Scuzz, MuchMusic, Kerrang! TV, RAC 105 TV, VH1, Fuse TV and Palladia.

History

Radio broadcast (1950s)
Prior to the 1950s most musical broadcasts were on a radio format. Most radio broadcasts were live music such as Classical music broadcasts—for example, the NBC Symphony Orchestra. In the 1950s broadcast television such as NBC, CBS, and ABC sought to move their popular radio broadcasts to a television format, such as Texaco Star Theater, which went from a radio broadcast to a telecast.

As networks continued to abandon radio for popular music broadcasting, the recording industry sought to influence sales by using television as a new vessel for promoting for their artists. The coordination between record companies and television saw the incorporation of musical acts in variety shows such as The Ed Sullivan Show (1948-1971), The Stage Show (1954-1956), and Texaco Star Theater (1948- 1956). Columbia records was the first to utilize this method by coordinating the release of a song on CBS's Studio One and then releasing it on audio format by the label on the next day. This practice introduced the success of the televised format for musical promotion.

Performers doing specials on variety shows also became common on television. Elvis Presley performed on numerous variety shows over the span of multiple per episodes, playing rock and roll music. His most controversial performance was his appearance on Texaco Star Theater where he did his now-signature dance moves of thrusting his pelvis suggestively during a performance of "You Ain't Nothing But A Hound Dog". This performance served as an opening to have younger and newer music targeted at a younger demographic; previously broadcasts were typically targeted towards the adult audience.

Network television (1960–1980)

In the 1960s NBC, CBS and ABC formed most of the music television market establishing themselves as the main sources for current music. A main contributor to the solidification of music broadcasting was the development of programs specifically designed to showcase music acts. This led to more technicians, set designers, producers, and directors training to specifically produce television content. The programs were of better quality than in the 1950s and gave a younger, more dynamic look to preexisting shows, such as The Ed Sullivan Show. The shift in production modality started to attract corporate sponsorships such as Ford, who used ad space in The Lively Ones to promote the Fairlane sedan to young car buyers.

Record labels and performers in the 1960s sought to utilize the newly founded music driven platform to introduce audiences to international acts such as The Beatles who performed in the US for the first time on The Ed Sullivan Show on February 9, 1964. The Beatles' performance served as the beginning of increased British influence in American popular culture. Other music-based variety programs gained popularity, including ABC's Shindig (1964-1966), and NBC's Hullaballoo (1965-1966), a rock and roll show targeted at young urban adults.  Another extension of the growth of television music can be seen in musical family acts of the 1970s such as The Monkees, The Partridge Family, The Jackson 5, and The Osmonds.

Cable television (1980s–2000)

On March 3, 1981 Warner-Amex introduced Music Television (MTV), the first television 24-hour cable network completely dedicated the broadcast of music videos. MTV was pitched to reach and profit from the young adult demographic. The purpose of MTV was to reuse previously made content by record labels for international audiences, which was free, and televise them in America in a top 40 Hits format.

On August 1, 1981 MTV was launched with its first broadcast of “Video Killed the Radio Star". The birth of MTV reinvented the previously successful strategies by record labels, sponsors, and performers had used on variety specials. This new network added the necessity of visual effect and video concept production to a previously mainly audio platform. This showed an influx of record labels and performers producing more high-quality videos and presenting a theme to their music and sound through visual platforms. Some record labels also decided to dedicate entire sections of their operation to music videos. In the late 1980s and early 90s MTV began cultivating a lifestyle for teen and college aged student. As video clips began to develop certain images for artist, such as Madonna, Bruce Springsteen, and New Kids on The Block, clothes and paraphernalia for these acts were also marketed along with the distribution of music.

Digital era (2000–present)

In the early 2000s with the rise of digital technologies the music industry as well as the network industry sough to elevate their platform into the digital era after the decline of cable network ratings. Network television started to broadcast reality television shows that were related but not centered to industry musical acts such as MTV Cribs, American Idol, and America's Got Talent which drew larger audiences than music videos. Certain television networks also sought to develop and broadcast their own award shows such as the Teen Choice Awards, the MTV Video Music Awards, and the American Music Awards.

In the 2010s came the appeal of providing more dynamic and fast content such as YouTube channels to premier music videos and social media accounts with the purpose of staying relevant and continuing to distribute content to the adolescent/ college age demographic. The YouTube streaming platform is now the main source for audiences to consume music video premiers and relevant content however MTV still runs reality television shows as well as awards shows.

Impact on the music industry
The impact that television music has had on music culture is that it allowed for aesthetic and personal style to the lead in terms of importance over sound in popular music. Before the age of MTV the term “pop” was a means to describe popular music at the given time. However, after music videos started to become more widespread the term “pop music” started to describe musical genre that was accompanied by specific aesthetics through visual art in conjunction to sound. Moreover,  to get a record deal in the time after 1981, when MTV had launched,  sound was not as important as image when it came to creating a novelty act or selling records. An example of this can be seen through Madonna and Michael Jackson who used the platform MTV to create careers that were based on music videos, choreography, and personal style over sonic performance.

The impact of music television on the music industry after the launch of MTV led to addition of specific visual art division within record labels  which had the specific intention of introducing new acts to audiences with a clear image. However this strategy sometimes was ineffective for up and coming artist since most commercial broadcasters wanted to air already established artist. Nevertheless, record companies found a way to overcome this problem by signing exclusivity deals with MTV to guarantee air play both their established artists as well their newer artists.

Additionally, a key factor in music television's success in the 80s and 90s was the evocative nature of music videos that were specifically targeted towards the teenage audience. The impact that MTV specifically had was that it was a window into popular trends and clothes  unlike in the twenty first century where trends are available through social media.

The extent of the effect of Television music after the late 90s is argumentative. In the golden era of music videos, 1985–1996, fame achieved through television was an integral part of the star-making process for the music industry. However the depletion of television rating going into the twenty first century  as well as the aspect that radio was the more dominant form of broadcast media in terms of longevity dating from the 1920s to the mid-late 1950s show that the effect of television in terms of longevity were scarce 

In the late 90s the expense of creating music video grew from tens of thousands to hundreds of thousands which made them less appealing as an easy market source. Starting in early 2000s YouTube and Myspace started removing the need to pay broadcasters for air time and the music industry had found a free replacement. following the launch of VEVO in 2009 the increase of music videos consumed on internet platform surpassed the expectation of record labels. Another aspect that lead to depletion of the effects of music television is that record companies were cutting video budgets and industry paper and moved most up to date content to digital platforms.

List of notable influential broadcasts

The Beatles on the Ed Sullivan Show 

On February 9, 1964, The Beatles performed for the first time in the United States, marking the beginning of "Beatlemania" in the United States.

Johnny Cash at Folsom Prison 
On January 13, 1968, Johnny Cash performed at Folsom State Prison in Folsom, CA. Cash was facing backlash from the new personnel at Columbia Records at the time because of  his pill addiction as well as the decline in popularity of country music. However, this performance allowed Cash a second chance at fame post his sobriety, revitalized his career, and ignited his interest in the cause of prison reform.

Elvis Presley: Comeback Special on NBC 

On December 3, 1968, Elvis Presley perform an hour long special on NBC, considering his decreasing popularity, which served as his return to live performance.

Jimi Hendrix: Woodstock Festival 
On August 18, 1969, Jimi Hendrix performed the American National Anthem “Star Spangled Banner” at Woodstock. Immediately after the performance, it was taken out of context by media outlets and considered to be a controversial, unorthodox rendition, and with possible protest of the Vietnam War. However, that did not stop it from becoming one of the most notable recorded broadcasts of all time.
On September 9, 1969, Hendrix later specified he played it because he was “An American” and “thought it was Beautiful” and the performance was not in relation to political protest.

Michael Jackson: Motown 25 
On March 25, 1983, Michael Jackson debuted one of his signature dance moves for the first time, the ‘moonwalk’, while performing his hit song “Billie Jean”. This performance served as a major promotional tool for his album Thriller which later became the bestselling album of all time.

Michael Jackson’s Thriller music video 

On December 2, 1983, the Michael Jackson’s Thriller music video debuted on MTV. The video revolutionized music video production and spawned the “making of” genre of music and film documentary. In 2009, it was the first music video to be inducted into the Library of Congress's National Film Registry.

Madonna: MTV Video Music Awards 
On September 14, 1984, Madonna performed her hit song “Like a Virgin” in a wedding dress and stage set as a wedding cake. This performance solidified Madonna's desire to break conventional female stereotypes on major television networks. This performance opened the door for Britney Spears, Christian Aguilera and many more to provoke audiences through more graphic or racy visuals.

Queen: Live Aid

On July 13, 1985, Queen performed a 22 minutes setlist at Live Aid out of the total 16-hour concert. However, Queen has been singled out by the likes of Dave Grohl, Elton John, and Bob Geldof as being the best performers of the day. The charisma of the band was shown through their lead singer Freddie Mercury who conducted the audience through his performance to ignite passion. Moreover, the reception of the performance in both the UK and North America was singled out as the most memorable of the 16-hour event.  it is the most watched or streamed since the event took place.

References